Whitehill is a surname.

Whitehill may also refer to the following places:

 Whitehill, Hampshire
 Whitehill, Kent
 Whitehill, Hamilton, Scotland
 Whitehill, Lesotho
 Whitehill, Midlothian
 Whitehill, Staffordshire

See also 

 White Hill (disambiguation)
 Whitehills